Esperón may refer to:

Ezequiel Esperón (1996–2019), Argentinian footballer
Grégorio Juan Esperón (1912–2000), Argentine professional football player and coach
Hermogenes Esperon (born 1952), retired Philippine Army general, National Security Adviser
Ignacio Fernández Esperón (aka Tata Nacho) (1894–1968), Mexican composer
Jose Francisco Fuentes Esperon (1966–2009), Mexican politician
Manuel Esperón (1911–2011), Mexican songwriter and composer
Natalia Esperón (born 1974), Mexican actress and former model
Soledad Esperón (born 1985), retired Argentine tennis player

See also
Esparron (disambiguation)
Esperan (disambiguation)
Espero (disambiguation)